Guman may refer to:
Guman, Iran (disambiguation), places in Iran
Mike Guman (b. 1958), American football player
Guman Mal Lodha (1926–2009), Indian politician and jurist

See also 
 Ghuman (disambiguation)